The 2015 Copa Colsanitas was a women's tennis tournament played on outdoor clay courts. It was the 18th edition of the Copa Colsanitas, and part of the International category of the 2015 WTA Tour. It took place at the Centro de Alto Rendimiento in Bogotá, Colombia, from April 13 through April 19, 2015.

Points and prize money

Point distribution

Prize money

Singles main-draw entrants

Seeds 

 Rankings are as of April 6, 2015.

Other entrants 
The following players received wildcards into the singles main draw:
  María Herazo González
  Yuliana Lizarazo 
  María Paulina Pérez García

The following players received entry from the qualifying draw:
  Cindy Burger 
  Beatriz Haddad Maia 
  Nastja Kolar 
  Mandy Minella 
  Anastasia Rodionova 
  Sachia Vickery

Withdrawals 
Before the tournament
  Lara Arruabarrena → replaced by  Sorana Cîrstea
  Varvara Lepchenko → replaced by  Danka Kovinić
  Christina McHale → replaced by  Kristína Kučová
  Laura Robson → replaced by  Patricia Mayr-Achleitner
  Anna Tatishvili → replaced by  Dinah Pfizenmaier

Doubles main-draw entrants

Seeds 

 Rankings are as of April 6, 2015.

Other entrants 
The following pair received a wildcard into the doubles main draw:
  María Paulina Pérez García /  Paula Pérez García

Champions

Singles 

  Teliana Pereira def.  Yaroslava Shvedova, 7–6(7–2), 6–1

Doubles 

  Paula Cristina Gonçalves /  Beatriz Haddad Maia def.  Irina Falconi /  Shelby Rogers, 6–3, 3–6, [10–6]

References

External links 
Official website

Copa Claro Colsanitas
Copa Colsanitas
Copa Claro Colsanitas